Etten-Leur is a municipality in the Dutch province North Brabant. Its name is a combination of the two villages from which the municipality originally acrose: Etten and Leur.

History
The villages were always part of one municipality, originally called "Etten c.a." (cum annexis), this later to change to "Etten en Leur". The current name was adopted in 1968. By that time, the villages had grown into one. 

Both villages, created in the Middle Ages, were relatively prosperous during the period of the Dutch Republic, the exception being the period of the Eighty Years' War in which the area was a major battleground. This prosperity was caused by the fact that Etten was a centre for the production of peat, and Leur was a local trading port, as it had a harbour.

Decline in economic importance marked both villages during the nineteenth century. In 1836 Arnold Damen left Leur in order to work as a missionary in the United States. The painter Vincent van Gogh briefly lived in Etten, making him the most famous citizen in the history of Etten and Leur.  During World War II, the two villages were freed from German occupation in late October 1944 by elements of the U.S. 104th Infantry Division.

The economic decline was halted when, in 1950, the Dutch government decided to encourage population growth and industrial development. As a result of this development, both towns have grown towards each other and merged into one: Etten-Leur.

Topography

Dutch topographic map of Etten-Leur (town), March 2014

Education
Katholieke Scholengemeenschap Etten-Leur, a Catholic high school
Munnikenheide College

Transportation
Etten-Leur railway station

Notable people 
 Jan Jacob Rochussen (1797 in Etten – 1871) a Dutch politician; Finance Minister 1840/1843 and Governor-General of the Dutch East Indies 1845/1851
 Peter de Clercq (born 1959 in Etten-Leur) a Dutch diplomat, who currently works with the United Nations
 Stef Broks (born 1981 in Etten-Leur) a Dutch drummer, played with Textures
 Danny van Trijp (born 1996 in Etten-Leur) a Dutch Darts player, who currently plays in PDC events
 Vincent van Gogh opened his first art studio in Etten in 1881. His career as an artist began in Etten.

Gallery

References

Notes

Sources 
Information about the history of Etten-Leur has been retrieved from the Regional Archive of Western Brabant and Info Etten-Leur

External links 

 

 
Municipalities of North Brabant
Populated places in North Brabant